Lamprosema santialis is a moth in the family Crambidae. It was described by Schaus in 1920. It is found in Cuba.

References

Moths described in 1920
Lamprosema
Moths of the Caribbean
Endemic fauna of Cuba